The women's Mass Start at the 2019 KNSB Dutch Single Distance Championships in Heerenveen took place at Thialf ice skating rink on Sunday 30 December 2018.

Result

Source:

References

Single Distance Championships
2019 Single Distance
World